David Craig Stevenson (3 May 1890 – 21 March 1977) was a Scottish first-class cricketer and administrator.

Stevenson was born at Kilmarnock in May 1890. He worked for the Inland Revenue as an inspector of taxes. He made his debut in first-class cricket for Scotland against the Marylebone Cricket Club at Lord's in 1922. He played first-class cricket for Scotland until 1925, making six appearances. He scored 96 runs across his six matches, at an average of 8.72, with a high score of 35. With his slow left-arm orthodox bowling, he took 4 wickets with best figures of 2 for 29. He later played minor counties cricket for Northumberland, making a single appearance against Durham in the 1932 Minor Counties Championship. He served as president of the Scottish Cricket Union in 1954. He died at Dundee in March 1977.

References

External links

1890 births
1977 deaths
Sportspeople from Kilmarnock
Scottish civil servants
Scottish cricketers
Northumberland cricketers
Scottish cricket administrators
20th-century Scottish businesspeople